V.J. and Angela Skutt Catholic High School, located in Omaha, Nebraska, United States, is a Catholic, college-preparatory high school established in 1993. It was named in honor of V. J. Skutt, the longtime Chairman of Mutual of Omaha, and his wife  Angela Skutt, who were prominent donors toward the school's construction. The school has a 1:16 teacher-student ratio.   It is located in the Roman Catholic Archdiocese of Omaha. In 2012 and 2022, it was announced that the Suburban Omaha-based Catholic School was one of only 50 private schools nationally to earn the prestigious title of "Blue Ribbon School." In 2015, the school came under fire when it declined to renew gay teacher's contract after his marriage announcement. The issue spurred a Change.org petition that garnered over 100,000 signatures. The teacher left the school to teach elsewhere.

Extracurricular activities
Every year the school hosts an "Angel Flight", a fundraising event. The school holds an All-Alumni Weekend for two days every July. It also hosts the Mr. SkyHawk Pageant, a comical event that pokes fun at beauty pageants. Other events include Hawktober, Powder Puff Football, Community Involvement Day, and Popsicle Day.

Athletics
School sports include baseball, basketball, bowling, cross country, football, golf, ice hockey, powerlifting, soccer, softball, swimming, tennis, track and field, trapshooting, volleyball, show choir, cheer, dance team, and wrestling, as well as intramurals. In 2009, Skutt made wrestling history with its 12th straight Class B wrestling title. On 19 November 2005, Skutt won the Class B 2005 football title, versus the McCook Bison. Other Skutt teams winning Class B State Championships in 2005–2006, included wrestling, boys' basketball, girls' soccer, girls' tennis, and boys' golf. Skutt Catholic had also won the class B state wrestling title for 13 years running, as of 2010 (a Nebraska state record). Skutt Catholic has had second-place finishes in powerlifting, but has yet to win the title. The Skutt Catholic dance team has won state championships for six years in a row. The basketball team has won the state title game.

State championships

Notable alumni
 Tony Schmitz (Class of 2004), selected in the 2008 MLS SuperDraft by four time MLS Cup Champion D.C. United
 Thomas Gilman (Class of 2012) 3x NCAA Wrestling All American from the University of Iowa. 2x Senior World Team member and World Silver Medalist
 Rachel Balkovec, minor league baseball coach

References

External links
 
 Skyhawk official website

Educational institutions established in 1993
Catholic secondary schools in Nebraska
High schools in Omaha, Nebraska
Roman Catholic Archdiocese of Omaha
1993 establishments in Nebraska